Beyond the Rocks is a 1922 American silent romantic drama film directed by Sam Wood, starring Rudolph Valentino and Gloria Swanson. It is based on the 1906 novel of the same name by Elinor Glyn. Beyond the Rocks was long considered lost but a nitrate print of the film was discovered in the Netherlands in 2003. The film was restored and released on DVD by Milestone Film & Video in 2006.

Plot

Captain Fitzgerald (Alec B. Francis), a retired guardsman on a modest pension, has to support three daughters: Theodora (Swanson) and her older half-sisters. Theodora's sisters pin their hopes on her marrying a wealthy man.

One day, Theodora goes out on a rowboat off the coast of Dorset and falls into the water. She is rescued by Lord Hector Bracondale (Valentino). He is young, handsome and wealthy, but "not the marrying kind". Out of a sense of duty to her beloved father, she reluctantly agrees to wed the middle-aged, short, stout Josiah Brown (Robert Bolder), a former grocer's assistant who is now a multi-millionaire.

They honeymoon in the Alps. By coincidence, Bracondale stops at the same inn. Rich American widow Jane McBride (Mabel Van Buren) persuades the young bride to accompany her on a climbing excursion. Theodora slips and dangles precariously by her safety line over a cliff. Bracondale appears and climbs down to her, but they are too heavy for the others to pull up. Bracondale has them lower him and Theodora to a ledge below. While they wait for more help to arrive, Theodora tells Bracondale (who does not initially recognize her) where they last met.

They meet a third time in Paris, and finally acknowledge their love for each other. However, Theodora refuses to run away with Bracondale.

Bracondale strives to do the right thing. He asks his sister, Lady Anningford (June Elvidge), to befriend Theodora. Lady Anningford invites the Browns to her country estate. Bracondale, however, cannot stay away. He tries once again to persuade Theodora to change her mind, without success. Meanwhile, Josiah is persuaded by another guest, renowned explorer Sir Lionel Grey, to fund his dangerous expedition. Bracondale leaves, and Josiah is called away on business. Theodora writes a letter to each; to Bracondale, she declares her love, but stresses once more that it cannot be fulfilled. Morella Winmarleigh (Gertrude Astor), who desires Bracondale for herself, secretly opens the letters and, after perusing them, switches them.

After Bracondale reads the message meant for Josiah, he rushes to stop Josiah from reading his, but is too late. Josiah accuses Bracondale of stealing his wife, but the nobleman denies that Theodora has been unfaithful.

After further consideration, Josiah decides to put his wife's happiness ahead of his own and joins Grey's expedition to Northern Africa. His death makes it possible for the young lovers to be together.

Differences from the book
While the book mostly takes place at dinner parties, picnics and balls, the film version changes many of the events to take place during perilous outdoor sports. Relatedly, the book's Bracondale never saves Theodora's life, as there is no particular danger for her to get into. Josiah in the book is chronically ill and dies after a long period of health problems; in the film he dies relatively quickly during an ambush while in Africa. The film also has added historical sequences, inspired by Cecil B. DeMille's work. Director Sam Wood had been an assistant director for DeMille.

Cast

 Rudolph Valentino (credited as Rodolph Valentino) as Lord Hector Bracondale
 Gloria Swanson as Theodora Fitzgerald
 Edythe Chapman as Lady Bracondale, Hector's mother
 Alec B. Francis as Captain Fitzgerald
 Robert Bolder as Josiah Brown
 Gertrude Astor as Morella Winmarleigh
 June Elvidge as Lady Anna Anningford
 Mabel Van Buren as Jane McBride
 Helen Dunbar as Lady Ada Fitzgerald
 Raymond Brathwayt as Sir Patrick Fitzgerald
 Frank Butler (credited as F. R. Butler) as Lord Wensleydon 
 Gino Corrado as Guest at Alpine Inn (uncredited)

Preservation status
Beyond the Rocks was considered a lost film. In the last years of her life Gloria Swanson professed a desire to see Beyond the Rocks with a modern audience primarily because much interest lingered for Valentino especially at the 50th anniversary of his death in 1976. The film was unavailable and considered lost at the time, save for a one-minute portion for the better part of the twentieth century until a print was found in the Netherlands in 2003. Gloria Swanson died in 1983.

The film was restored by the Nederlands Filmmuseum and the Haghefilm Conservation. It turned up among about two thousand rusty film canisters donated by an eccentric Dutch collector, Joop van Liempd of Haarlem. It was given its first modern screening in 2005.

The restored version was released on DVD in 2006.

Gallery

See also
 List of rediscovered films

References

External links

 
 
 The AFI Catalog of Feature Films:Beyond the Rocks (Joop's print viewed)
 

1922 films
1922 romantic drama films
1920s rediscovered films
American romantic drama films
American silent feature films
American black-and-white films
Famous Players-Lasky films
Films based on British novels
Films based on romance novels
Films directed by Sam Wood
Films set in England
Films shot in Los Angeles
Films set in Paris
Films set in Dorset
Paramount Pictures films
Rediscovered American films
1920s American films
Silent romantic drama films
Silent American drama films